George Barnett (1859–1930) was 12th Commandant of the United States Marine Corps

George Barnett may also refer to:

 George E. Barnett (1873–1938), American economist
 George Ezra Barnett (born 1993), British singer-songwriter
 George Barnett (musician born 1988), English drummer for These New Puritans and model
 George I. Barnett (1815–1898), American architect
 George Vern Barnett (1891–1946), Australian organist, choir master and accompanist
 George Barnett (historian) (1876–1965), Irish historian, archaeologist, botanist, geologist, folklorist and poet

See also
 George Burnett (disambiguation)